Vasile Gliga (born April 3, 1959) is a Romanian entrepreneur and the owner and founder of the Gliga Group, a company manufacturing string instruments. He was elected to the Parliament of Romania in 2008.

Company Information
Born in Ibănești, Mureș County, Gliga is the owner of a Romanian enterprise manufacturing violins, violas and cellos in Reghin, Romania called the Gliga Group that has been operating since the 1990s. His son, Cristian, opened a US branch of the company in Pasadena, CA around 2001. The Gliga Group makes an estimated $5,000,000+ a year.

Gliga also serves as the member of presidium of the World Dancesport Federation and its vice-president for marketing.

References 

 Article from Time Magazine, 18 August 2003

External links 
 Company website, http://www.gliga.ro/
 US Branch website & Online Store, http://www.violinslover.com 
 Canadian Store, http://www.violinslover.ca
 UK suppliers, http://elidatrading.co.uk and others

Living people
1959 births
People from Mureș County
Romanian luthiers
Social Democratic Party (Romania) politicians
Members of the Chamber of Deputies (Romania)